The coat of arms of Ingushetia was instituted on August 26, 1994. In the center of the circle is an eagle (symbolizing nobility, courage, wisdom, and faith) and a battle tower (symbol of old and young Ingushetia). In the background is Stolovaya mountain ("Matloam") on the left of the tower and Kazbek mountain ("Bashloam") on the right. Above the tower a yellow sun is shining in blue sky.

The name of the republic appears above the seal in Russian (Республика Ингушетия) and below the seal in Ingush (ГӀалгӀай Мохк).

The small triskelion near the bottom of the seal references the flag of Ingushetia.

Sources
Heraldry of the World: Ingushetia

Ingushetia
Ingushetia
Ingushetia
Ingushetia
Ingushetia
Ingushetia
Ingushetia
Ingushetia